The Galway International Arts Festival (GIAF), founded in 1978, is a cultural organization that produces an annual arts festival in Galway, Ireland. It also produces new work that tours nationally and internationally, in addition to presenting the discussion forum, "First Thought Talks". The festival maintains a non-profit status.

History 
The Galway Arts Festival organization was founded in 1978 by University College Galway's Arts Society in collaboration with community activists of Galway Arts Group. The first festival was described in local papers as "Galway Arts Society's Week of Craic". Their original budget was €1000 of Arts Council Funding and most of the artistic events were staged in an arts centre that now homes Sheridan's Cheesemongers.

The name was changed in 2014 to the Galway International Arts Festival to emphasize the diversity of contributors to the festival. "The festival presents and produces work in Galway which sits side by side with the work of artists and companies from around the world," Artistic Director Paul Fahy stated. The name change also facilitated the vision of the festival as a producing body, creating works that tour internationally.

Festival 
The festival takes place in Galway for two weeks in late July. It presents and produces programmes across theatre, music, visual arts, opera, street spectacle, dance, discussion, and comedy. The 2018 festival set records for attendance, breaking a quarter million for the first time, representing a 20% increase over the participants in the 2017 festival. Over 600 artists created and took part in over 200 events across the festival. This 41st festival also featured a new Festival Garden in Eyre Square, offering pop-up performances and local food stands. The Festival Garden attracted more than 145,000 people. Visitors to the 2017 festival were estimated to be 45% from Galway, 18% around the rest of Ireland, and 37% outside of Ireland.

Touring 
The organisation has produced or co-produced more than 20 productions which have toured to London, New York, Edinburgh, Chicago, Adelaide, Sydney, Hong Kong, and Washington. These include four exhibition commissions. GIAF has also fostered a relationship with Landmark Productions, a Dublin-based production company. Together, they have produced multiple works written by or directed by Irish playwright Enda Walsh that have toured internationally.

Music

GIAF has hosted musical guests in their Big Top tent, erected yearly in the Fisheries Field on the campus of NUI Galway. GIAF has also partnered with local music and comedy venue Róisín Dubh for some of their programmed events. Performances in the music programme have included: Elvis Costello, Suede, The National, St. Vincent, Philip Glass, David Byrne, Blondie, Kronos Quartet, Brodsky Quartet and Bon Iver.

Visual arts

Visual artists who have exhibited have included David Hockney, Bill Viola, Henri Matisse, Patricia Piccinini, Hughie O'Donoghue, David Mach and John Gerrard.

In 2018, GIAF announced a new Internship programme in the visual arts to train 25 participants to be able to engage with patrons in the galleries.

Theatre and dance
Irish playwright Enda Walsh has featured in past GIAF line-ups. His first play, "Disco Pigs", which was also Cillian Murphy's first stage role, debuted at the festival in 1997. Walsh has since gone on to work with the festival to produce works ranging from operas to experimental staged 'rooms.' His 2014 play Ballyturk won Best Production at the Irish Times Theatre Awards and his 2011 play Misterman toured to New York City and was the New York Times Critics' Choice for eighteen days in a row.

American actor John Mahoney was a frequent performer in the festival starting in 2000. Visiting international theatre and dance companies have included the National Theatre, Propeller, The Royal Court, Steppenwolf, Fabulous Beast Dance Company, Hofesh Shechter Dance Company, Michael Clark Company, Druid Theatre Company and the Bristol Old Vic.

First Thought Talks
Starting in 2012, GIAF hosted a series of talks at each festival revolving around the festival's theme. The 2018 festival's First Thought Talks about 'Home' was opened by President Michael D. Higgins and was followed up by 43 other scholars, artists, scientists, and athletes, both Irish and international. The majority of these talks are recorded and can be accessed online. They are also live-streamed on Facebook.

Gallery

References

Annual events in Ireland
Arts festivals in the Republic of Ireland
Arts Festival
July events
Parades in Ireland
Tourist attractions in Galway (city)
Festivals established in 1978
1978 establishments in Ireland